This is a list of women photographers who were born in the United Kingdom or whose works are closely associated with that country.

A
 Sarah Angelina Acland (1849–1930), an amateur photographer who pioneered colour in Gibraltar in 1903 and 1904 and later in Madeira
 Fiona Adams (1935–2020), known for photographing the Beatles
 Deborah Anderson (born 1970), photographer, musician, film director
 Nudrat Afza (born 1955), Bradford-based documentary photographer
 Heather Agyepong (fl 2018), photographer, visual artist and actor
 Heather Angel (born 1941), nature photographer
 Sue Arrowsmith (1950–2014), artist creating experimental photographic compositions
 Olivia Arthur (born 1980), documentary photographer
 Anna Atkins (1799–1871), a botanist, the first person to publish a book illustrated with photographic images
 Emily Allchurch (born 1974) a British artist who is known for using digital photography and lightbox art to create new works based on masterpieces of world art
 Anna Atkins (1799–1871), botanist and pioneering photographer, first person to publish a book containing photographs
 Shona Auerbach (fl 1996), photographer and cinematographer

B
 Marjorie Baker (1912 - 2004), documented changing life in Sussex from mid to late twentieth century
 Shirley Baker (1932–2014), known for street photography and street portraits
 Lisa Barnard (born 1967), documentary photographer, political artist, and senior lecturer on documentary photography at University of South Wales
 Kate Barry (1967–2013), fashion photographer
 Emma Barton (1872–1938), portrait photographer, autochromes, awarded the Royal Photographic Society Medal in 1903 
 Rebecca Lilith Bathory (born 1982), also known as Rebecca Litchfield
 Janette Beckman (fl 1970s), documentary photographer
 Mabel Bent (1847–1929), pioneer travel photographer, working in the Eastern Mediterranean, southern Africa and the Arabian peninsular  
 Zarina Bhimji (born 1963), photographer of the effects of the expulsion of Asians from Uganda and other migration issues
 Dorothy Bohm (born 1924), originally from Königsberg, initially portraits, later street photography, from 1985 in colour
 Gemma Booth (active since 2009), fashion photographer
 Ethel Booty (1873–1964), photographer of buildings
 Jane Bown (1925–2014), portrait photographer, also worked for The Observer
 Carla Borel (born 1973), French-British portrait and street photographer
 Sonia Boyce (born 1962), contemporary artist, photographer, educator
 Polly Braden (born 1974), documentary photographer,
 Sarah Anne Bright (1793–1866), artist, photographer, produced the earliest surviving photographic images taken by a woman
 Zana Briski (born 1966), documentary, especially insects
 Christina Broom (1862–1939), said to be Britain's first female press photographer
 Alicia Bruce (born 1979), photographer and educator
 Zoë Buckman (born 1985), multi-media artist, photographer
 Cindy Buxton (born 1950), wildlife photographer, filmmaker

C
 Juno Calypso (born 1989), photographer who makes self-portraits
 Julia Margaret Cameron (1815–1879), notable early work, closely cropped portraits of celebrities, 800 of her works owned by the Royal Photographic Society
 Hilda Mabel Canter (1922–2007), mycologist and photographer
 Scarlett Carlos Clarke (born 1992), photographer and artist
 Natasha Caruana (born 1983), photographic artist
 Gayle Chong Kwan (born 1973), installation artist employing photography and video
 Araminta de Clermont (born 1971), artistic photographer
 Keturah Anne Collings (1862-1948), photographer, painter 
 Hannah Collins (born 1956), contemporary artist, filmmaker, photographer
 Lena Connell (1875–1949), suffragette and photographer
 
 Joan Craven (1897–1979), photographer
 Elaine Constantine (born 1965), photographer, filmmaker
 Care Johnson (born 1993), photographer, blogger, makeup artist

D
 Muriel Darton (1882–1945), suffrage activist and professional photographer
 Siân Davey (born 1964)
 Corinne Day (1962–2010), fashion and documentary photographer
 Araminta de Clermont (born 1971), art photographer
 Venetia Dearden (born 1975), photographer, filmmaker
 Susan Derges (born 1955), photographic artist, camera-less photography
 Chloe Dewe Mathews (born 1982), documentary photographer
 Mary Dillwyn (1816–1906), the earliest female photographer in Wales
 Zoë Dominic (1920–2011), dance and theatre photographer

E
 Olive Edis (1876–1955), portraits and early autochromes, diascope viewer
 Amanda Eliasch (active since 1999), photographer, artist, filmmaker
 Amelia Ellis (born 1977), German-British novelist and photographer

F
 Florence Farmborough (1887–1978), writer, photographer, nurse 
 Candice Farmer (born c. 1970), underwater fashion photographer
 Mary Georgina Filmer (1838–1903), early proponent of photomontage
 Mary Fitzpatrick (born 1968), known for her work on spaces abandoned after conflict
 Amy Flagg (1893–1965), historian and photographer
 Anna Fox (born 1961), office life in London, "Made in" series on Milton Keynes, Kansas, Gothenburg and Florence
 Constance Fox Talbot (1811–1880), wife of Henry Fox Talbot, experimented with photography as early as 1839 
Catriona Fraser (born 1972), photographer and art dealer
 Melanie Friend (born 1957), photographer, educator
 Jill Furmanovsky (born 1953) specialises in documenting rock musicians.

G
 Yishay Garbasz (born 1970), contemporary artist, photographer
 Sophie Gerrard (born 1978), documentary photographer
 Paula Rae Gibson (born 1968), art photography
 Fay Godwin (1931–2005), landscape photographer
 Leah Gordon (born 1959)
 Eva Grant (born 1925), Greek–British figure photographer
 Yvonne Gregory, (1889–1970) society and figure photographer

H
 Pamela Hanson (active since 2001), fashion photographer
 Eleanor Hardwick (born 1993), contemporary artist, photographer, curator
 Emma Hardy (born 1963)
 Alice Seeley Harris (1870–1970), missionary, documentary photographer
 Clementina Hawarden (1822–1865), portrait photographer in the 1860s, predating Julia Margaret Cameron
 Claudette Holmes (born 1962), known for her representations of Black people
 Kate Holt (born 1972), Zimbabwe-born British photojournalist
 Alice Hughes (1857–1939), leading London portrait photographer specialising in images of fashionable women and children

I
 Nadine Ijewere (born 1992), fashion and portrait photographer

J
 Adama Jalloh (born 1993), portrait and documentary photographer
 Care Johnson (born 1993), photographer, retoucher, public speaker
 Andrea Jones (born 1960), garden photographer
 Elsbeth Juda (1911–2014), fashion photographer

K
Ann Kelley (born 1941), children's writer, poet, photographer

L
 Etheldreda Laing (1872–1960), early autochrome photographs

M
 Neeta Madahar (born 1966), artistic photographer specialising in nature, birds and flora
 Jessie Mann (1805–1867), early Scottish photographer, assistant of David Octavius Hill and Robert Adamson
 Georgina Masson (1912–1980), photographer, non-fiction writer
 Chloe Dewe Mathews (born 1982), documentary photographer
 Mary McCartney (born 1969), ballet dancers, Spice Girls 
 Wendy McMurdo (born 1962), exploring the relationship between technology and identity
 Lotte Meitner-Graf (1899–1973), portrait photographer in Vienna until 1937 when she came to London, Great Britain
 Margaret Mitchell (born 1968), Scottish portrait and documentary photographer
 Maria Mochnacz (fl 1990s), photographer and video music director
 Augusta Mostyn (1830–1912), philanthropist, artist, photographer
 Tish Murtha (1956–2013), documentary photographer

N
 Caroline Emily Nevill (1829–1827), early photographer and pioneering member of the Photographic Exchange Club

P
 Laura Pannack (born 1985), social documentaries and portraits
 Eileen Perrier (born 1974) 
 Vinca Petersen (born c. 1972)
 Jill Posener (born 1953), lesbian photographer, playwright
 Sarah Pickering (born 1972)

Q
 Terri Quaye (born 1940), musician, ethnographic photographer

R
 Franki Raffles (1955–1994), social documentary photographer
 Eileen Ramsay (1915–2017), known for yachting and powerboat photography
 Suze Randall (born 1946), erotic photographer
 Sophy Rickett (born 1970), installation artist and photographer
 Edith Rimmington (1902–1986), surrealist artist, poet and photographer
 Grace Robertson (1930–2021), photojournalist contributing to Picture Post and Life in the 1950s
 Ellen Rogers (born 1983), portrait and fashion photographer
 Mary Rosse (1813–1885), began experimenting with photography in 1842

S
 Jane Martha St. John (1801–1882), known for her 1856 calotypes of Rome and other towns in Italy, now in the J. Paul Getty Museum and the Metropolitan Museum of Art
 Jo Metson Scott
 Philippa Scott (1918–2010), wildlife photographer
 Pepita Seth (active since 2000s), known for her photographs of elephants
 Pennie Smith (born c. 1949), black-and-white portraits, rock groups
 Sally Soames (1937–2019), newspaper photographer
 Jo Spence (1934–1992), known for her self-portraits depicting her fight against cancer
 Doreen Spooner (1928–2019), first female photographer on Fleet Street
 Marilyn Stafford (1925–2023), American-British photographer and photojournalist
 Hannah Starkey (born 1971), staged settings of women in city environments
 Jemima Stehli (born 1961), known for her naked self-portraits
 Hilary Stock (born 1964), fine art photographer
 Clare Strand (born 1973), conceptual photographer
 Maud Sulter (1960–2008), fine artist, photographer, writer and curator
 Ella Sykes (1863–1939), travel writer and photographer

T
 Mitra Tabrizian (born 1959), professor of photography at the University of Westminster
 Sam Taylor-Wood (born 1967), art photography, portraits
 Anya Teixeira (1913–1992), founded the Creative Photo Group
 Eveleen Tennant (1856–1937), photographer, family and visitors
 Alys Tomlinson (born 1975), portrait and landscape photographer
 Abbie Trayler-Smith, documentary and portrait photographer
 Amelia Troubridge (born 1974), portrait, documentary photographer
 Edith Tudor-Hart (1908–1973), photographer and ERussian spy
 Emma Turner (1866–1940), pioneering bird photographer

V
Vivienne (1889–1982), photographer, singer, writer

W
 Maxine Walker (born 1962), focus on portraits of Black people
 Agnes Warburg (1872–1953), influential early colour photographer  
 Gillian Wearing (born 1963), conceptual artist also working with photography, video and installations
 Alison Webster (died 2011), photojournalist
 Jeanie Welford (1854–1947), early commercial female photographer
 Janine Wiedel (born 1947), documentary photographer and visual anthropologist
 Jane Wigley (1820–1883), early photographer opening studios in Newcastle and London in the mid-1840s 
 Val Wilmer (born 1941), writer-photographer specialising in jazz, gospel, blues, and British African-Caribbean music and culture
 Rhonda Wilson (1953–2014), women's activist, photographer and writer
 Vanessa Winship (born 1960), portraiture and landscapes, particularly in Turkey, Georgia and the US
 Olivia Wyndham (1897–1967), society photographer

Y
 Catherine Yass (born 1963), bright colour, images often a combination of the positive and negative, subjects ranging from toilets to empty cinemas and Bollywood stars 
 Madame Yevonde (1893–1975), pioneered colour in portrait photography, including a series of guests at a party dressed as Roman and Greek gods and goddesses

See also
List of women photographers

References

-
British women photographers, List of
Photographers
Photographers